Mo Lua may refer to:

 Mo Lua of Killaloe, saint and founder of Killaloe, County Clare, Ireland
 Mo Lua of Kilmoluagh, saint among the Soghain of County Galway, Ireland
 Mo Lua mac Carthach, an Irish cleric associated with Clonfert or Cloonfad
 Saint Moluag, also known as Mo Lua

Irish-language masculine given names